Hautz is a Navarrese oronym that may be found in the following place names:
Hautza or Autza (1 306 m), a mount in the west of Saint-Étienne-de-Baïgorry
Ixtauz (Istauz, Ichtauz,1 024 m) for Aitz-hautz, an example of tautological place name, in the south of the Hautza
Hauzkoa (1268 m), with the diminutive -ko, a mount near Béhorléguy
Etxauz, name of the castle of Saint-Étienne-de-Baïgorry
Hautzai Pass (965 m), in Urepel
Auztarri (1 412 m), for Autz-harri, a mount above the dam of Irabia, in the Irati Valley, in Navarre.

Place name element etymologies
Navarre